Associazione Sportiva Morolo Calcio is an Italian association football club located in Morolo, Lazio. It currently plays in Eccellenza. Its colors are white and red.

References

External links
Official site

Football clubs in Italy
Association football clubs established in 1966
Football clubs in Lazio
Italian football clubs established in 1966